The Orchestre National de Bretagne (ONB) is a French symphony orchestra. Previously named the "Orchestre symphonique de Bretagne", it obtains the national label in October 2019. Before April 2012, it was simply called "Orchestre de Bretagne".

History 
Founded in 1989 to make up for the lack of symphonic concerts in the Brittany region, it is composed of 44 musicians.

The musical director has been Grant Llewellyn since 2015. 

The general manager is Marc Feldman.

In early 2015, the Orchestre National de Bretagne launched its own record label.

Repertoire 
 L'Orchestre se lâche : the musical universe is vast and diverse, the ONB includes this diversity in its season such as a symphonic work by Dave Brubeck and his son Chris.

Recordings 
 Beethoven – Concerto pour piano n°1 rondo
 Schumann – Concerto pour piano allegro affettuoso
 Haydn – Concerto pour violoncelle Moderato
 Ropartz – Pêcheur d’Islande les danses
 Tanguy – Portraits XXI Intrada
 Jean Cras – Mélodies avec orchestre
 Didier Squiban – Symphonie Bretagne
 Didier Squiban – Symphonie Iroise
 Serge Prokofiev – Peter and the Wolf / Perig Hag Bleiz
 Mozart – Concertos n°9 and 20
 Louise Farrenc – the complete symphonies (3 symphonies)

References

External links 
 

French orchestras
Brittany